Geuzenveld-Slotermeer is a neighborhood and former borough (stadsdeel) comprising some of the most western parts of the city of Amsterdam, Netherlands.
As a borough it existed from 1990 till 2010, when it merged with the boroughs Osdorp and Slotervaart to form the new borough Amsterdam Nieuw-West.

Geuzenveld-Slotermeer comprised the following neighborhoods and areas:
 Eendracht
 Geuzenveld
 Spieringhorn
 Slotermeer

Amsterdam Nieuw-West
Former boroughs of Amsterdam